Mark Tang-shan/Tan-sun Chen, born September 16, 1935, in Tainan Prefecture (now part of Tainan City), Taiwan, is a Taiwanese politician, former Secretary-General of the Office of the President of Taiwan under former President Chen Shui-bian. He was also previously Foreign Minister of the ROC from 2004 to 2006 (the first Democratic Progressive Party member to occupy the position). Before returning to Taiwan, he worked for the United States Department of Commerce for 19 years.

Career in Taiwan politics
Chen became part of the Taiwan independence movement while he was completing his post-graduate education in the United States. In 1970, he organized the World United Formosans for Independence. After the establishment of the World Federation of Taiwanese Associations, Chen Tang-shan became its president from 1979 to 1984.

Because of his political views, Chen was put on a blacklist by the Kuomintang government  during this time, and was unable to return to Taiwan.  He was eventually allowed to return with the advent of Taiwan's democratization. In 1992, Chen joined the Democratic Progressive Party and was elected a member of the Legislative Yuan. In December 1993, he was nominated the candidate of Tainan County Magistrate by the DPP and was elected. He was reelected again in 1997 with 66% of the vote.

In 2001, Chen returned to the Legislative Yuan as a representative of Tainan County. He became the Republic of China's thirty-second Foreign Minister in 2004. After Frank Hsieh resigned his Premiership and a subsequent cabinet shuffle, Chen became the Secretary of the Presidential Office. In 2004, Chen gained international attention and prompted substantial criticism worldwide after he commented that Singapore is a "booger-size country" that "holding China's ball sacks" with both hands, known as the "LP incident". Subsequently, the Singaporean Foreign Ministry has issued a statement warning Taiwan authorities to "not belittle Singapore, and avoid using “vulgar words to hurt others". Despite such comment, Singaporean politicians and lawmakers across the board and political spectrum overall refused to be drawn into a war of words or tensions over Chen's comments, which were described as "vulgar" and "undiplomatic", and even prompted criticism from some Taiwanese politicians, who urged him to withdraw such comments to avoid letting Singapore-Taiwan relations from deteriorating over the incident. However, Chen has not since taken back such words, but overall bilateral relations were not otherwise affected.  

In 2012, Chen was again elected to the Legislative Yuan for a four-year term, once again representing Tainan County.

Alleged special fund misuse and acquittal

On September 21, 2007, Chen faced charges of using false receipts to write off expenses from a special governmental account; the alleged misuse involved 368,199 Taiwan dollars (12,454 USD) during his time as foreign minister and presidential secretary general between July 2004 and June 2006. Vice President Annette Lu and DPP chairperson Yu Shyi-kun were also indicted on special fund abuse charges on the same day. Subsequently, in 2012, the Taipei District Court dismissed the case against Chen, finding him not guilty of all charges. Both Lu and Yu were similarly found not guilty. The court ruled that all three officials did not improperly use their special allowances and discretionary state affairs funds.

Personal life
He is a distant relative of Japanese politician Renhō.

References

1935 births
Magistrates of Tainan County
Democratic Progressive Party Members of the Legislative Yuan
National Taiwan University alumni
Taiwan independence activists
Taiwanese Ministers of Foreign Affairs
Taiwanese people of Hoklo descent
Living people
Tainan Members of the Legislative Yuan
Recipients of the Order of Brilliant Star
Taiwanese expatriates in the United States
United States Department of Commerce officials
Members of the 8th Legislative Yuan
Members of the 5th Legislative Yuan
Members of the 2nd Legislative Yuan
Party List Members of the Legislative Yuan